CA2, CA-2 or CA II may refer to :
 Carbonic anhydrase II, a human gene
 the United States Court of Appeals for the Second Circuit
 California's 2nd congressional district
 Hummel CA-2, an ultralight aircraft
 California State Route 2
 Ca II, a singly-ionized calcium that produces the H and K lines, and the calcium triplet lines in the spectrum of many stars
 Cornu Ammonis 2, a region of the hippocampus